Alfred Sisley (30 October 1839 – 29 January 1899) was an Impressionist landscape painter who was born and spent most of his life in France, but retained British citizenship. He was the most consistent of the Impressionists in his dedication to painting landscape en plein air (i.e., outdoors). He deviated into figure painting only rarely and, unlike Renoir and Pissarro, he found that Impressionism fulfilled his artistic needs.

Among his important works are a series of paintings of the River Thames, mostly around Hampton Court, executed in 1874, and landscapes depicting places in or near Moret-sur-Loing. The notable paintings of the Seine and its bridges in the former suburbs of Paris are like many of his landscapes, characterised by tranquillity, in pale shades of green, pink, purple, dusty blue and cream. Over the years Sisley's power of expression and colour intensity increased.

Biography

Sisley was born in Paris to affluent British parents. His father, William Sisley, was in the silk business, and his mother, Felicia Sell, was a cultivated music connoisseur.

In 1857, at the age of 18, Alfred Sisley was sent to London to study for a career in business, but he abandoned it after four years and returned to Paris in 1861. From 1862, he studied at the Paris École des Beaux-Arts within the atelier of Swiss artist Marc-Charles-Gabriel Gleyre, where he became acquainted with Frédéric Bazille, Claude Monet, and Pierre-Auguste Renoir. Together they would paint landscapes en plein air rather than in the studio, in order to capture the transient effects of sunlight realistically. This approach, innovative at the time, resulted in paintings more colourful and more broadly painted than the public was accustomed to seeing. Consequently, Sisley and his friends initially had few opportunities to exhibit or sell their work. Their works were usually rejected by the jury of the most important art exhibition in France, the annual Salon. During the 1860s, though, Sisley was in a better financial position than some of his fellow artists, as he received an allowance from his father.

In 1866, Sisley began a relationship with Eugénie Lescouezec (1834–1898; usually known as Marie Lescouezec), a Breton living in Paris. The couple had two children: son Pierre (born 1867) and daughter Jeanne (1869). At the time, Sisley lived not far from Avenue de Clichy and the Café Guerbois, the gathering-place of many Parisian painters.

In 1868, his paintings were accepted at the Salon, but the exhibition did not bring him financial or critical success; nor did subsequent exhibitions.

In 1870, the Franco-Prussian War began; as a result, Sisley's father's business failed, and the painter's sole means of support became the sale of his works. For the remainder of his life he would live in poverty, as his paintings did not rise significantly in monetary value until after his death. Occasionally, however, Sisley would be backed by patrons, and this allowed him, among other things, to make a few brief trips to Britain.

The first of these occurred in 1874, after the first independent Impressionist exhibition. The result of a few months spent south-west of London was a series of nearly twenty paintings of the non-tidal Thames at East Molesey and below its Hampton Court Bridge where the south bank becomes Thames Ditton which was later described by art historian Kenneth Clark as "a perfect moment of Impressionism."

Until 1880, Sisley lived and worked in the country west of Paris; then he and his family moved to a small village near Moret-sur-Loing, close to the forest of Fontainebleau, where the painters of the Barbizon school had worked earlier in the century. Here, as art historian Anne Poulet has said, "the gentle landscapes with their constantly changing atmosphere were perfectly attuned to his talents. Unlike Monet, he never sought the drama of the rampaging ocean or the brilliantly colored scenery of the Côte d'Azur."

In 1881, Sisley made a second brief voyage to Great Britain.

In 1897, Sisley and his partner visited Britain again, and were finally married in Wales at Cardiff Register Office on 5 August. They stayed at Penarth, where Sisley painted at least six oils of the sea and the cliffs. In mid-August they moved to the Osborne Hotel at Langland Bay on the Gower Peninsula, where he produced at least eleven oil paintings in and around Langland Bay and Rotherslade (then called Lady's Cove). They returned to France in October. This was Sisley's last voyage to his ancestral homeland. The National Museum Cardiff possesses two of his oil paintings of Penarth and Langland.

The following year Sisley applied for French citizenship, but was refused. A second application was made and supported by a police report, but illness intervened, and Sisley remained a British national until his death.

He died on 29 January 1899 of throat cancer in Moret-sur-Loing at the age of 59, a few months after the death of his wife. His body was buried with that of his wife at Moret-sur-Loing Cemetery.

Work

Sisley's student works are lost. His first landscape paintings are sombre, coloured with dark browns, greens, and pale blues. They were often executed at Marly and Saint-Cloud. Little is known about Sisley's relationship with the paintings of J. M. W. Turner and John Constable, which he may have seen in London, but some have suggested that these artists may have influenced his development as an Impressionist painter, as may have Gustave Courbet and Jean-Baptiste-Camille Corot.

He was inspired by the style and subject matter of previous modern painters Camille Pissarro and Edouard Manet. Among the Impressionists, Sisley has been overshadowed by Monet, whose work his resembles in style and subject matter, although Sisley's effects are more subdued. Described by art historian Robert Rosenblum as having "almost a generic character, an impersonal textbook idea of a perfect Impressionist painting", his work strongly invokes atmosphere, and his skies are always impressive. He concentrated on landscape more consistently than any other Impressionist painter.

Among Sisley's best-known works are Street in Moret and Sand Heaps, both owned by the Art Institute of Chicago, and The Bridge at Moret-sur-Loing, shown at Musée d'Orsay, Paris. Allée des peupliers de Moret (The Lane of Poplars at Moret) has been stolen three times from the Musée des Beaux-Arts in Nice – once in 1978 when on loan in Marseilles (recovered a few days later in the city's sewers), again in 1998 (when the museum's curator was convicted of the theft and jailed for five years with two accomplices), and finally in August 2007 (on 4 June 2008 French police recovered it and three other stolen paintings from a van in Marseilles).

A large number of fake Sisleys have been discovered. Sisley produced some 900 oil paintings, some 100 pastels and many other drawings.

During the Nazi period (1933–1945) a number of Sisley works were taken from Jewish art collectors by Nazis or their agents as part of the massive looting of Jews that preceded the Holocaust. On 18 June 2004 Sisley's Soleil de printemps, le Loing (1892) was restored to the family of Louis Hirsch, in a ceremony in Paris.

In 2008 a dispute erupted between Alain Dreyfus, an art dealer in Switzerland, and the auction house Christie's over a Sisley painting First Day of Spring in Moret, that was claimed by the Lindon family in court in Paris. Dreyfus said that Christie's had not sufficiently examined the work's history, or provenance, before putting it up for sale.

Also in 2008, the  Sisley Bateux en Réparation à Saint Mammès (1885) was recognised as having been looted by the Nazis and the subject of a settlement with the heirs of Benno and Frances Bernstein who had owned it before Nazi occupation.

Numerous Sisleys such as Winter Landscape were known to have been seized by the Nazi looting organisation known as the  E.R.R.  and still have not been found.

The German Lost Art Foundation has 24 listings for Sisley.

Selected works

 Avenue of Chestnut Trees near La Celle-Saint-Cloud (1865)
 View of Montmartre from Cité des Fleurs to Les Batignolles (1869)
 The Bridge at Villeneuve-la-Garenne (1872)
 Ferry to the Ile-de-la-Loge – Flood (1872)
 La Grande-Rue, Argenteuil (c. 1872)
 Square in Argenteuil (Rue de la Chaussee) (1872)
  (1872)
 Chemin de la Machine, Louveciennes (1873)
  (1873)
 Hampton Court Bridge (painting) (1874)
 Molesey Weir – Morning (1874)
 Regatta at Molesey (1874)
 Under Hampton Court Bridge (1874)
 The Terrace at Saint-Germain, Spring (1875)
 The Small Meadows in Spring, By (c. 1881)

Gallery

Notes

References
Bomford, David, Jo Kirby, John Leighton, Ashok Roy, and Raymond White (1990). Impressionism. London: National Gallery. 
Daulte, F. (1959). Alfred Sisley Catalogue raisonnee de l'oeuvre peint 
Denvir, B. (2000). The Chronicle of Impressionism: An Intimate Diary of the Lives and World of the Great Artists. London: Thames & Hudson. 
Poulet, A. L., & Murphy, A. R. (1979). Corot to Braque: French Paintings from the Museum of Fine Arts, Boston. Boston: The Museum. 
Reed, Nicholas, (2008). Sisley on the Thames and the Welsh Coast. Lilburne Press. 
Rosenblum, Robert (1989). Paintings in the Musée d'Orsay. New York: Stewart, Tabori & Chang. 
Turner, J. (2000). From Monet to Cézanne: late 19th-century French artists. Grove Art. New York: St Martin's Press.

External links

 Alfred Sisley.org
 Paintings by Sisley

 
 Impressionism : a centenary exhibition, the Metropolitan Museum of Art, December 12, 1974 – February 10, 1975, fully digitised text from The Metropolitan Museum of Art libraries

 
1839 births
1899 deaths
19th-century English painters
19th-century French painters
Artists from Paris
English male painters
French male painters
British alumni of the École des Beaux-Arts
British Impressionist painters
Deaths in France
Deaths from throat cancer
French Impressionist painters
French people of English descent